West Blocton is a town in Bibb County, Alabama, United States. At the 2020 census, the population was 1,217. The current mayor is Daniel Sims.

History
It was built on land once owned by Uriah Smith, near the company town Blocton. Many of its non-native residents were immigrants from various European countries, with Italians being the largest, as they came to do mining in the area. West Blocton has a neighborhood previously named "Dago Hollow" and now called Little Italy.

Geography

West Blocton is located in northern Bibb County at  (33.118733, -87.122875), at the southern terminus of the Appalachian Mountains.

It is on a midway point between Birmingham and Tuscaloosa.

Alabama State Route 5 passes through the town, west of the town center, leading north  to Woodstock and south  to Brent and Centreville, the county seat.

West Blocton Coke Ovens Park blends history with nature, providing a place to relax and learn about the history of the industrial era of Alabama and how the Coke Ovens supplied the steel of the South.

Demographics

2020 census

As of the 2020 United States census, there were 1,217 people, 472 households, and 295 families residing in the town.

2010 census
As of the census of 2010, there were 1,240 people, 494 households, and 341 families residing in the town. The racial makeup of the town was 85.6% White, 13.2% Black or African American, 0.4% Native American, 0.1% from other races, and 0.6% from two or more races. 0.1% of the population were Hispanic or Latino of any race.

There were 494 households, out of which 22.3% had children under the age of 18 living with them, 49.6% were married couples living together, 14.6% had a female householder with no husband present, and 31.0% were non-families. 29.1% of all households were made up of individuals, and 14.7% had someone living alone who was 65 years of age or older. The average household size was 2.51 and the average family size was 3.10.

In the town, the population was spread out, with 22.8% under the age of 18, 7.2% from 18 to 24, 25.1% from 25 to 44, 27.2% from 45 to 64, and 17.7% who were 65 years of age or older. The median age was 41.1 years. For every 100 females, there were 93.1 males. For every 100 females age 18 and over, there were 101.9 males.

The median income for a household in the town was $34,844, and the median income for a family was $59,875. Males had a median income of $37,384 versus $31,167 for females. The per capita income for the town was $22,224. About 11.3% of families and 11.4% of the population were below the poverty line, including 12.2% of those under age 18 and 12.0% of those age 65 or over.

Economy
The community's original economy was coal. By 2002 industry left the town. Robert Dewitt of the Tuscaloosa News stated that the community remained active despite the lack of jobs, and that "While downtown West Blocton is a shell of its former self, the place isn’t a ghost town."

Notable people
 Mel Allen, broadcaster for the New York Yankees, was a frequent visitor to West Blocton, where his grandfather, Julius Israel, resided as a boy.   
Another member of the Israel family was Mel Allen's first cousin, Elmo Israel Ellis, pioneer radio broadcaster, WSB/ Cox Broadcasting Corporation in Atlanta, GA.  Ellis was Valedictorian of West Blocton High School, Class of 1936.
 Sammie Lee Hill, who was drafted in the fourth round of the 2009 NFL Draft by the Detroit Lions, was born in West Blocton in 1986. He is a graduate of West Blocton High School and Stillman College.
 Debra Marshall, known from her days with the WCW and WWE, was raised in West Blocton.
 Frank Pratt, former baseball player for the Chicago White Sox, was born in Blocton, a town to the east of West Blocton that no longer exists.
 Mildred Lee Scudder, author of children's books, was born in Blocton on February 19, 1908.
 Colonel James B. Swindal, U.S. Air Force, pilot of Air Force One during the administrations of Presidents John F. Kennedy and Lyndon B. Johnson; including Texas trip during which Kennedy was assassinated.
Children's book author and artist Melinda Logan resides in West Blocton. She also created a poster in honor of the 2017 Cahaba Lily Festival. The poster featured her children's book character Victor Viola.
 Rufus Parker, a well known Inventor who has created and patented inventions such as a carbon steel wheel lock for 18 wheelers, His most noted invention was an "oil jaw lock" after an oil company commissioned his help after a string of crude oil thefts. Mr. Parker was born and raised in West Blocton, leaving in 1949, briefly staying in Chicago IL and Cleveland OH. Unable to find satisfaction in either town, Mr. Parker enlisted in the US Army where he served in Korea, earning medals along the way. Upon his return to the states and discharge from the Army, Mr. Parker became the very first individual in United States history to receive a small business loan, acquiring a Peterbuilt 18 wheeler with it. Growing tired of highway runs, Parker sold his Peterbuilt and went into business with blues legend Albert King, buying a nightclub in St. Louis.

Education
Bibb County School District operates West Blocton High School.

Trivia
West Blocton is known for its historic beehive ovens, built in the late 1880s for coke production.
 A feature-length documentary, West Blocton: Small Town, Big Heart, was made in 2012 by Michael J. Logan, an independent filmmaker whose family is from the town. The film covers the history of West Blocton from its inception in 1884 as a coal mining town until present day.

Climate
The climate in this area is characterized by hot, humid summers and generally mild to cool winters.  According to the Köppen Climate Classification system, West Blocton has a humid subtropical climate, abbreviated "Cfa" on climate maps.

References

External links 
 Dead link
 History of West Blocton, Encyclopedia of Southern Jewish Communities
 West Blocton History Short Notes, West Blocton Bible Methodist Church
 West Blocton Coke Ovens Park

Towns in Alabama
Towns in Bibb County, Alabama
Birmingham metropolitan area, Alabama